K. Damodaran ( February 25, 1912 – July 3, 1976) was an Indian Marxist theoretician and writer and one of the leader of the Communist Party of India in Kerala, India.

Early life and education
Damodaran was born in Ponnani in Malappuram district, the son of Kizhakkiniyakath Thuppan Nampoothiri and Keezhedathu Narayani Amma. He had his schooling in Government School, Tirur, and college education in Samoothiri College, Calicut. His first socialist activities were associated with being secretary of the student movement 'Kerala Students Movement' and he joined the freedom struggle. He was arrested in 1931 for participating in the civil disobedience movement and sentenced to rigorous imprisonment for 23 months. While in Coimbatore jail he learned Tamil and Hindi. He went to Kasi (UP) in 1935 to study Sanskrit from the Viswa Vidyalaya there and  passed the Shastri examination. While at Kasi he learned Urdu and Bengali and was attracted to Communist ideology.

Political career
Lal Bahadur Shastri was his classmate. He was attracted to Communist ideology through his senior Onkar Nadashasthri. Thus he became a Communist – the first 'Malayalee Communist'. He returned to Kerala in 1937 and joined the Kerala Socialist Party and in May the same year formed the Kerala unit of the Communist Party of India. He organized Coir and Beedi workers.  He was imprisoned twice and released in 1945. In 1951, he was elected as the Taluk secretary of the Malabar unit committee of the Communist Party. He contested the assembly election in 1951 and the Loksabha election in 1957. Damodaran was elected to the central executive committee of the party in 1960. He took charge of editing the Navayugam weekly. All through these years he was intellectually active by way of writing articles and books, learning new languages and debating on various forums.

He became a Rajya sabha member (MP) in 1964. He visited many Asian and European countries including almost all of the communist nations. After the tenure, he devoted his time to a comprehensive research on the history of the Party at (JNU) under an ICHR fellowship.
He was the first progressive writer in Malayalam. 'pattabakki' was the first political drama to be staged in kerala which, in a way, paved the way for the advancement of communist ideology among the common people. He dwelled deep into Indian Philosophy which was  considered solely spiritual until then and discovered new streams of material thoughts in it. His celebrated works 'Bharatheeya Chintha' and 'Indiayude athmavu' speaks volumes of the metamorphosis. he was a multilinguist and could speak for hours on thought provoking subjects.

He died on July 3, 1976, in Delhi at the Safdarjung Hospital while he was still conducting this research. Damodaran was a multilingual scholar and translated many books from Russian to Malayalam. Apart from Pattabaakki, he wrote another play named Rakthapanam. The stories written between 1934 and 1935 are now a collection known as Kannuneer. In all his works, party popularization was seen. The best known of his works is Indiyude Atmavu and in English, an excellent exposition of 'Indian Culture' and 'Philosophy from the ancient times'. He completed only first part of Kerala History based on archeology, anthropology and coin sciences. Political activist and documentary director K. P. Sasi is the son of Damodaran.

Works

In Malayalam
Jawaharlal Nehru
Eka Vazhi
Kannuneer (short stories)
Karl Marx
Samashtivada Vijnapanam (translation of the Communist Manifesto)
Paattabaakki (play)
Rakthapaanam (play)
Russian viplavam (co-authored with E. M. S. Namboodiripad)
Manushyan
Dhanasasthrapravesika
Uruppika
Nanayaprasnam
Communism Enthu Enthinu ?
Purogamana sahithyam Enthinu?
Communisavum Christhumathavum
Marxism (in 10 parts)
Indiayude Aathmavu
Keralathile Swathanthryasamaram (co-authored with C Narayana pillai)
Dhanasasthra thathwangal
Dharmikamoolyangal
Enthanu saahithyam
Chinayile Viplavam
Keralacharithram
Sahithya niroopanam
Indiayum Socialisavum
Indiayude Sampathikabhivrudhi
Innathe Indiayude Sampathikasthithi
Yesuchristhu Moscowil
SamoohyaParivarthanangal
Socialisavum Communisavum
Panam Muthal Nayapaisa Vare
Indiayile Deseeyaprasthanam(Translated directly from Russian)
Marxisathinte Adisthanathathwangal
Bharatheeyachintha
Sreesankaran Hegel Marx
Oru Indian Communistinte Ormakkurippukal

In English
Indian Thought
Man and Society in Indian Philosophy
Marx Hegel and Sreesankara
Marx Comes to India (co-authored with P.C.Joshi)

In Hindi
Bharatheeya chinthaa parampara

References

Notes

Other sources

External links
 

1912 births
1976 deaths
20th-century Indian journalists
20th-century Indian politicians
Communist Party of India politicians from Kerala
Hindi-language writers
Indian Communist writers
Indian independence activists from Kerala
Indian Marxist historians
Indian Marxist writers
Indian Sanskrit scholars
Journalists from Kerala
Malayalam-language writers
Malayali politicians
Marxist theorists
Scholars from Kerala